Brent Christopher Gallaher (born May 13, 1969 in Cumberland, Maryland) is an American jazz saxophonist and composer.

He is the son of Linda (Swearingen) Gallaher and Christopher S. Gallaher. His father was a professor of music at Frostburg State University. The Gallaher family moved to Morehead KY in 1972 when Christopher was hired by the Morehead State University. Brent spent his childhood in the small college town.

Being the son of a musician, Brent began studying music at an early age. At the age of 6, he began studying piano and throughout elementary school, Brent acted and sang in the university's musical theater productions. Brent began studying saxophone at age 11, studying with David Anderson.

Brent was a quick and dedicated study and was playing professionally by age 16. David Anderson, Professor of Jazz and Studio Music at Morehead State, gave Brent the opportunity to play tenor saxophone with the college's top jazz ensemble. Brent played with MSU for two years and while with them was recruited by trumpeter Pat Harbison to study at the University of Cincinnati – College-Conservatory of Music. Brent visited the school and accepted a scholarship to study jazz at the prestigious music school.

Early career 
In the fall of 1988, Brent moved to Cincinnati, Ohio and began his studies with Rick VanMatre and Pat Harbison at the CCM. Brent thrived in this creative environment, surrounded by other gifted musicians. He also had many opportunities to play with local and nationally know musicians. Some of the names include Cal Collins, Kenny Poole, Steve Schmidt, Art Gore, Wilbert Longmire, The Blue Wisp Big Band and the Psychoacoustic Orchestra.

After 3 years at the CCM, Brent was offered a position on the famed Glenn Miller Orchestra. He toured with the ensemble from 1991 to 1992 and can be heard on their album Here We Go Again—1992 Victor. He returned to Cincinnati and the CCM in 1992 and in 1994 completed his Bachelors in Jazz Performance. While at the CCM Brent was featured was on their album Carnival of Life—1994, Alissa Records.

After graduating, Brent continued freelancing in and around the Cincinnati area.

Performing career 
In November 1998, Brent was called to tour with the Tommy Dorsey Orchestra under the direction of Buddy Morrow. Brent was with the Dorsey band for just under a year. He returned to Dorsey in 2000 and was with them for an additional seven months.

Brent has since been working as a freelance musician and has performed with the Blue Wisp Big Band, Cohesion Jazz Ensemble, Cal Collins, the Phil DeGreg Trio, the Ron Enyard Trio, Wilbert Longmire, Ed Moss Society Jazz Orchestra, the Vintage Keys Project and the Psychoacoustic Orchestra. The Cohesion Jazz Ensemble and The Psychoacoustic Orchestra are featured on J-Curve’s Cincinnati Jazz Collection Vol. 1 (1998) with Brent as a member. Brent also recorded with the Psychoacoustic Orchestra on Blackstone's Hidden Treasures—Cincinnati's Tribute to King Records' Legacy (2003).

In August 2003, Brent completed the recording of his first CD Vanessa's Song and it was released in March 2004. This CD features Jim Connerley on piano, Jim Anderson on bass and Tony Franklin on drums. Brent recorded with Over the Rhine, in the fall of 2004, on their album Drunkard's Prayer—Virgin/Back Porch Records. He can also be heard on The Jazz Circle’s debut CD Joshua, which was released March 2006.

March 2010 marked the release of Brent's second recording project titled Lightwave. This features the talents of Dan Karlsberg on piano, Steve Whipple on bass and Anthony Lee on drums.

Presently, Brent continues to freelance and can be heard with a wide variety of groups including his own groups, the Dan Karlsberg Nati 6, the Cincinnati Contemporary Jazz Orchestra, the Pete Wagner Band, the Blue Wisp Big Band, the Art Gore Quartet, the Cincinnati Pops Orchestra.

Teaching 
Brent Gallaher has been teaching saxophone, improvisation and piano since the early 1990s and continues doing so today. He has a private studio of students ranging from elementary school to postgraduate students. He worked as an instructor at the University of Cincinnati – College-Conservatory of Music and was a member of their faculty Jazztet from 2010-2013. Currently, Brent is an adjunct faculty member in the Jazz Department of the University of Dayton (Ohio).

Discography

Albums
 Vanessa's Song (V&B, 2003)
 Lightwave (V&B, 2010)
 Moving Forward (V&B, 2016)

As supporting member
 Here We Go Again by Glenn Miller Orchestra (1992)
 Carnival of Life by Cincinnati College Conservatory of Music Jazz Ensemble and Combo (1994)
 For the Love of It by Deborah Locke (1997)
 Cincinnati Jazz Collection Vol. 1 by Various artists (1998)
 Hidden Treasures—Cincinnati's Tribute to King Records' Legacy by Various artists (2003)
 Drunkard's Prayer by Over the Rhine (2004)
 Kentucky Symphony Orchestra Salutes Frank Sinatra, an American Icon by Kentucky Symphony Orchestra (2005)
 Joshua by The Jazz Circle (2006)
 After 5 by The CCM Faculty Jazztet (2013)
 One for Four by New Third Stream Quartet (2014) – Composer on "Pure"
 Second Springtime by Larry Dickson (2015)
 Moon and Shadow by John Zappa (2015)
 Nati 6 by Dan Karlsberg (2015)

References

1969 births
Living people
American jazz saxophonists
American male saxophonists
Jazz musicians from Ohio
Musicians from Cincinnati
University of Cincinnati – College-Conservatory of Music alumni
21st-century American saxophonists
21st-century American male musicians
American male jazz musicians
People from Cumberland, Maryland